Ancylotropis may refer to:
 Ancylotropis (beetle), a genus of beetles in the family Anthribidae
 Ancylotropis (plant), a genus of flowering plants in the family Polygalaceae